Florence is a station on the River Line light rail system, located on John Galt Way off of U.S. Route 130 in Florence Township in Burlington County, New Jersey, United States, although it is addressed as being on Route 130.

The station opened on March 15, 2004. Southbound service from the station is available to Camden, New Jersey. Northbound service is available to the Trenton Rail Station with connections to New Jersey Transit trains to New York City, SEPTA trains to Philadelphia, Pennsylvania, and Amtrak trains. Transfer to the PATCO Speedline is available at the Walter Rand Transportation Center.

Park and ride service is available at this station, which uses only two of the three tracks at the station.

Transfers 
 New Jersey Transit buses: 409 and 413
 BurLink B5

References 

2004 establishments in New Jersey
Florence Township, New Jersey
River Line stations
Railway stations in the United States opened in 2004
Railway stations in Burlington County, New Jersey